Kamisuku Airport  is an airport serving the town of Kalima in Democratic Republic of the Congo.

See also

Transport in the Democratic Republic of the Congo
List of airports in the Democratic Republic of the Congo

References

External links
 OpenStreetMap - Kamisuku
 OurAirports - Kamisuku
 FallingRain - Kamisuku
 HERE Maps - Kamisuku
 

Airports in Maniema